Cédric Yambéré (born 6 November 1990) is a Central African footballer who plays as a centre-back for Greek Super League 2 club Chania and the Central African Republic national team.

Club career

Bordeaux
Yambéré joined Girondins de Bordeaux in January 2013 from US Lormont. He made his Ligue 1 debut at 25 October 2014 against Paris Saint-Germain playing the full game in a 3–0 away defeat.

Anzhi Makhachkala (loan)
On 13 July 2016, he joined the Russian club Anzhi Makhachkala for the 2016–17 season on loan.

APOEL (loan)

On 24 January 2017, he moved on loan to the Cypriot First Division champions APOEL FC until the end of the 2016–17 season. He made his official debut on 11 February 2017, playing the full 90 minutes in APOEL's 1–0 away victory against Karmiotissa in the league. He scored his first official goal on 23 April 2017, netting a late equalizer in APOEL's 1–1 home draw against Anorthosis.

Dijon
On 30 June 2017, Yambéré left Bordeaux definitively, and signed a two-year deal with fellow Ligue 1 side Dijon for a transfer fee of around €500,000.

Ettifaq
On 29 June 2019, Yambéré signed a three-year deal with Saudi Professional League club  Ettifaq.

Orléans
On 1 October 2021, he signed with Orléans in the French third-tier Championnat National.

International career
Yambéré received his first international call from Central African Republic on 13 August 2016. He made his debut on 27 March 2017, in Central African Republic's 1–2 friendly defeat against Gambia at Stade municipal de Kénitra.

Career statistics

International
.

Honours
APOEL
 Cypriot First Division: 2016–17

References

External links
 APOEL official profile

1990 births
Living people
French sportspeople of Central African Republic descent
Citizens of the Central African Republic through descent
Footballers from Bordeaux
Association football defenders
Central African Republic footballers
Central African Republic international footballers
French footballers
Ligue 1 players
Russian Premier League players
Cypriot First Division players
Saudi Professional League players
Challenger Pro League players
Championnat National players
Championnat National 2 players
Championnat National 3 players
FC Girondins de Bordeaux players
APOEL FC players
FC Anzhi Makhachkala players
Dijon FCO players
Ettifaq FC players
RWDM47 players
US Orléans players
Central African Republic expatriate footballers
Central African Republic expatriate sportspeople in Russia
Expatriate footballers in Russia
Central African Republic expatriate sportspeople in Cyprus
Expatriate footballers in Cyprus
Central African Republic expatriate sportspeople in Saudi Arabia
Expatriate footballers in Saudi Arabia
Central African Republic expatriate sportspeople in Belgium
Expatriate footballers in Belgium
Black French sportspeople